Elba is a town in Genesee County, New York, United States. The population was 2,370 at the 2010 census. The town is at the northern border of the county and is north of the city of Batavia. The town contains the village of Elba, located near the town's center.

History 
The area was first settled in 1803. The town of Elba was established in 1820, from a partition of the town of Batavia. In 1842, part of Elba was used to form the town of Oakfield.

In 1884, the community of Elba set itself off from the town by incorporating as a village.

In 1948, as his "Whistle Stop" Campaign Tour passed through, Harry Truman referred to the onion smell from the local muck fields.  He then stated that the town should be renamed "Smelba" .

Elba had three mines under its main land, which originated in 1788.

Geography
According to the United States Census Bureau, the town has a total area of 35.7 square miles (92.5 km2), all  land.

The north town line is the border of Orleans County (town of Barre).

Part of the Alabama Swamp is in the northwest corner of the town, through which flows Oak Orchard Creek.

North-South NYS 98 and east-west NYS 262 intersect in Elba village.

USGS maps of the area name the section including Ridge Road as "Bulgary Ridge". Prior to more recent maps, in 1897 USGS maps, the area was called "Vulgary".

Torrey Farms, one of the largest farms in New York, is located in the town of Elba.

Demographics

As of the census of 2000, there were 2,439 people, 853 households, and 668 families residing in the town.  The population density was 68.3 people per square mile (26.4/km2).  There were 910 housing units at an average density of 25.5 per square mile (9.8/km2).  The racial makeup of the town was 93.07% White, 1.72% Black or African American, 0.49% Native American, 0.08% Asian, 3.90% from other races, and 0.74% from two or more races. Hispanic or Latino of any race were 5.25% of the population.

There were 853 households, out of which 36.1% had children under the age of 18 living with them, 65.4% were married couples living together, 9.1% had a female householder with no husband present, and 21.6% were non-families. 16.8% of all households were made up of individuals, and 8.1% had someone living alone who was 65 years of age or older.  The average household size was 2.82 and the average family size was 3.18.

In the town, the population was spread out, with 27.7% under the age of 18, 7.7% from 18 to 24, 30.2% from 25 to 44, 23.3% from 45 to 64, and 11.2% who were 65 years of age or older.  The median age was 37 years. For every 100 females, there were 102.2 males.  For every 100 females age 18 and over, there were 94.9 males.

The median income for a household in the town was $46,161, and the median income for a family was $51,058. Males had a median income of $37,244 versus $24,688 for females. The per capita income for the town was $18,470.  About 5.9% of families and 6.5% of the population were below the poverty line, including 10.4% of those under age 18 and 4.8% of those age 65 or over.

Communities and locations in the Town of Elba 
 East Elba – A hamlet on Norton Road in the southeast corner of the town.  Home to the East Elba Motorcycle Gang from the 1970s.
 Elba – The village of Elba is located on Route NY-98.
 Davis Corners – A former community in the south part of the town.
 Daws (also called "Daws Corners") – A location south of Elba village on Route NY-98 at the south town line.
 Five Corners – A hamlet south of East Elba on the town line.
 Langton Corners – A community north of the village on Oak Orchard Road.

References

External links
 Town/Village of Elba official website
  Early Elba, NY history
  Local history page

Towns in Genesee County, New York